Mantidactylus alutus is a species of frog in the family Mantellidae.
It is endemic to Madagascar.
Its natural habitats are subtropical or tropical moist montane forests, subtropical or tropical seasonally wet or flooded lowland grassland, subtropical or tropical high-altitude grassland, rivers, intermittent rivers, arable land, pastureland, rural gardens, urban areas, heavily degraded former forest, and seasonally flooded agricultural land.

References

alutus
Endemic frogs of Madagascar
Taxa named by Mario Giacinto Peracca
Amphibians described in 1893
Taxonomy articles created by Polbot